Ochancourt is a commune in the Somme department in Hauts-de-France in northern France.

Geography

Population

History
Within the commune, on the ‘land of graves’, are said to rest the remains of those that died (9000+ ) at the  Battle of Saucourt-en-Vimeu, where Louis III of France fought and defeated the Normans in 881. Other historians claim it is the site of the battle itself.

Places of interest

 The church, with parts dating from the twelfth century
 The family chapels in the cemetery and at the crossroads

See also
Communes of the Somme department

References

Communes of Somme (department)